The following is a list of symbols of the U.S. state of Kansas.

State symbols

 Kansas state motto: Ad astra per aspera  (Latin for To the stars through difficulties)
 Kansas state nickname: Sunflower State

 United States quarter dollar - buffalo (American bison) and sunflower

See also
 List of Kansas-related topics
 Lists of United States state insignia
 State of Kansas
 Kansas Day

References

External links
 Kansas Symbols

State symbols
Kansas